Mycobacterium saskatchewanense is a species of Mycobacterium.

It is closely related to Mycobacterium interjectum.

References

External links	
Type strain of Mycobacterium saskatchewanense at BacDive -  the Bacterial Diversity Metadatabase

saskatchewanense